The 1960 Rutgers Scarlet Knights football team represented Rutgers University in the 1960 NCAA University Division football season. In their first season under head coach John F. Bateman, the Scarlet Knights compiled an 8–1 record, won the Middle Three Conference championship, outscored their opponents 225 to 69. 

The team's statistical leaders included Sam Mudie with 452 passing yards, Steve Simms with 613 rushing yards, and Arnie Byrd with 269 receiving yards.

Schedule

References

Rutgers
Rutgers
Rutgers Scarlet Knights football seasons
Rutgers Scarlet Knights football